The second season of Beverly Hills, 90210, an American teen drama television series aired from July 11, 1991, on Fox and concluded on May 7, 1992, after 28 episodes.

Overview
The Walshes first summer in the infamous zip code is filled with heartbreak, fraud, lies, betrayal and it also marks the time for new  relationships to blossom, but it also marks the end for others. As their Junior Year approaches, the group face their biggest challenge yet as a death causes shock waves.

Cast

Starring
Jason Priestley as Brandon Walsh 
Shannen Doherty as Brenda Walsh 
Jennie Garth as Kelly Taylor  
Ian Ziering as Steve Sanders  
Gabrielle Carteris as Andrea Zuckerman  
Luke Perry as Dylan McKay 
Brian Austin Green as David Silver  
Tori Spelling as Donna Martin 
Carol Potter as Cindy Walsh  
James Eckhouse as Jim Walsh

Recurring
Joe E. Tata as Nat Bussichio 
Douglas Emerson as Scott Scanlon 
Christine Elise as Emily Valentine 
Denise Dowse as Vice Principal Yvonne Teasley 
David Lascher as Kyle Conners

Episodes

Reception

Ratings

Home media
Season two was released on DVD in 2007 in Regions 1, 2 and 4. It is currently available to stream via CBS Access, however, some episodes are missing due to copyright permissions. The missing episodes are episodes 6, 8, 14, 17, 18, 23, 26, and 27.

References

1991 American television seasons
1992 American television seasons
Beverly Hills, 90210 seasons